Halyna Obleshchuk (Cyrillic: Галина Облещук; born 23 February 1989) is a Ukrainian athlete specialising in the shot put.

Career
She is a member of the Ivano-Frankivsk, U (Cyrillic: Івано-Франківська, У) club.  

She represented her country at two consecutive World Championships, in 2013 and 2015, her best result being the ninth place on the first occasion. She has not participated in the Olympics, however she is recognised by the organisation.  

Her personal bests in the event are 19.40 metres outdoors (Kiev 2014) and 18.31 metres indoors (Sumy 2014).

Competition record

References

External links 
 
 

1989 births
Living people
Ukrainian female shot putters
World Athletics Championships athletes for Ukraine
Place of birth missing (living people)
Athletes (track and field) at the 2016 Summer Olympics
Olympic athletes of Ukraine